Bernard Teissier (born 1945)  is a French mathematician and a member of the Nicolas Bourbaki group. He has made major contributions to algebraic geometry and commutative algebra, specifically to singularity theory, multiplicity theory and valuation theory.

Teissier attained his doctorate from Paris Diderot University in 1973, under supervision of Heisuke Hironaka. He was a member and a leading figure of Nicolas Bourbaki. Along with Alain Connes, he gave the 1975/1976 Peccot Lectures. He was an invited speaker at the International Congress of Mathematics at Warsaw in 1983.

In 2012, he became a fellow of the American Mathematical Society.

References

External links
Website

1945 births
Living people
20th-century French mathematicians
21st-century French mathematicians
University of Paris alumni
Fellows of the American Mathematical Society
Nicolas Bourbaki